Chinchipena is a genus of moths belonging to the family Tortricidae.

Species
Chinchipena elettaria Razowski, 1999

See also
List of Tortricidae genera

References

 , 2005: World Catalogue of Insects vol. 5 Tortricidae.
 , 1999, Acta Zoologica Cracoviensia 42: 328.

External links
tortricidae.com

Euliini
Tortricidae genera